Antti Halonen (born February 2, 1982) is a Finnish professional ice hockey defenceman who currently plays for KalPa in the Finnish Liiga. Halonen returned to KalPa after two seasons with Timrå IK of the then Elitserien on April 19, 2012.

Career statistics

References

External links

1982 births
Living people
People from Kajaani
Finnish ice hockey defencemen
Hokki players
KalPa players
Timrå IK players
HC TPS players
Sportspeople from Kainuu
21st-century Finnish people